Kevin Alexander Paredes (born May 7, 2003) is an American professional soccer player who plays as a left-back for Bundesliga club VfL Wolfsburg.

Career

Loudoun United 
Paredes played his first professional match with Loudoun United FC on September 25, 2019, subbing in the 68th minute of the team's 4-1 win over the Swope Park Rangers.

D.C. United 
On January 17, 2020, Paredes signed with Loudoun's parent club D.C. United and became the club's 14th Homegrown Player signing. Paredes got his first playing time with D.C. United later that year, during a July 18 match against the New England Revolution in the MLS is Back Tournament, where he entered the game in the 88th minute as a substitute. He contributed his first MLS assist on October 24, serving Gelmin Rivas's stoppage time winner in a 2–1 win over Atlanta United.

Paredes scored his first MLS goal on July 3, 2021, in a record-breaking 7–1 win against Toronto FC at home.

Wolfsburg 
On January 28, 2022, Paredes signed with VfL Wolfsburg of the German Bundesliga, becoming the fourth homegrown player from D.C. United to transfer to Europe. The transfer fee was reported to be around $7,350,000.

In April 9, 2022, Paredes made his debut for Wolfsburg against Arminia Bielefeld.

Paredes scored his first Bundesliga goal for Wolfsburg on January 28th, 2023, after being subbed on in a 2-1 loss to SV Werder Bremen.

Personal life
Born in the United States, Paredes is of Dominican descent. He is eligible to represent the Dominican Republic and the United States men's national soccer team. So far, he has been called up to the United States youth national teams, but neither senior side.

Career statistics

Club

References

External links
Profile at the VfL Wolfsburg website

2003 births
Living people
American soccer players
Association football midfielders
Loudoun United FC players
D.C. United players
VfL Wolfsburg players
Soccer players from Virginia
USL Championship players
American sportspeople of Dominican Republic descent
Homegrown Players (MLS)
Major League Soccer players
Bundesliga players
American expatriate soccer players
American expatriate soccer players in Germany
Association football fullbacks